Snøkolla or Snykolla is the highest mountain on the island of Langøya (the third largest island on the mainland of Norway). The mountain is located in Øksnes Municipality in Nordland county.

References

Øksnes
Mountains of Nordland
Vesterålen